John James Branney (born 7 November 1985 in Whitehaven, Cumbria) is a former motorcycle speedway rider from England.

Career
Branney rode for the Workington Comets in the Premier League.

Family
His brother Craig Branney was also a professional speedway ride.

References 

1985 births
Living people
British speedway riders
English motorcycle racers
Sportspeople from Whitehaven
Berwick Bandits riders
Glasgow Tigers riders
Stoke Potters riders
Workington Comets riders